Heinz Wassermann (26 June 1939 – 3 March 2022) was a German footballer who played as a left back.

Career
Born in Oberhausen, Wassermann moved from Rot-Weiss Essen to Mainz 05 in 1964, staying with the club until 1970 and making 200 competitive appearances for the club, scoring 18 goals. He then spent a year with VfR Groß-Gerau.

Personal life
Wassermann died in Mainz, Rhineland-Palatinate on 3 March 2022, at the age of 82.

References

1939 births
2022 deaths
Sportspeople from Oberhausen
German footballers
Association football fullbacks
Regionalliga players
Rot-Weiss Essen players
1. FSV Mainz 05 players
Footballers from North Rhine-Westphalia